The Boffin, the Builder and the Bombardier is an Australian documentary series produced in Canberra by Bearcage Productions and Concannon TV. The series had its debut in April 2013, when it screened weekly on the Australian Broadcasting Corporation's ABC1. It features a team of three people – John Concannon (the boffin), Will Upjohn (the builder), and Tony Miller (the bombardier) – who engage in "experimental archaeology" to lightheartedly recreate historical devices and test hypotheses based on their efficiency.

Background
The series was created and written by John Concannon who also played the part of the "boffin" in the series, and was produced by Michael Tear, John Concannon, Serge Ou and Harriet Pike, with Serge Ou handling the direction. It was filmed around Canberra, using predominantly local resources, and the characters of the three main roles were based on the skills of the performers, with Will Upjohn, (the builder), working in construction, and Tony Miller involved in historical reenactments.

Episodes

See also
 MythBusters

References

External links
 Bearcage Productions

2010s Australian documentary television series